S/2004 S 24 is a natural satellite of Saturn, and the outermost known prograde satellite. Its discovery was announced by Scott S. Sheppard, David C. Jewitt, and Jan Kleyna on October 7, 2019 from observations taken between December 12, 2004 and March 22, 2007.

S/2004 S 24 is about 3 kilometres in diameter, and orbits Saturn at an average distance of 22.901 Gm in 1294.25 days, at an inclination of 35.5° to the ecliptic, in a prograde direction and with an eccentricity of 0.085. Due to its inclination being similar to the four known members of the Gallic group, S/2004 S 24 could belong to the Gallic group. However, its orbit is much more distant, which puts this classification into question. It could very well be in a group of its own.

The exact formation mechanism of S/2004 S 24 is unknown, and due to its low eccentricity (0.085) a captured orbit is unlikely. Nonetheless, S/2004 S 24 orbits in the opposite direction of all other moons in its orbital region, making it unlikely to have survived in this orbit over the entire history of the Solar System.

References

Gallic group
Irregular satellites
Moons of Saturn
Discoveries by Scott S. Sheppard
Astronomical objects discovered in 2019
Moons with a prograde orbit